Nieves is a Spanish surname and a female given name from the title of the Virgin Mary Nuestra Señora de las Nieves, meaning "Our Lady of the Snows." There is also a Scottish Nieves surname that originated in Nevay, located in Angus, Scotland, and thus can be found in that country of United Kingdom<ref
name="House of Names"></ref> The Portuguese variant is Neves. The Spanish surname is most commonly found in Mexico, Venezuela, Puerto Rico, Philippines, Spain, and in many other Latin American countries. It is also common in the Canary Islands and its variant Neves is particularly common in Portugal as well as in the autonomous region of Galicia, Spain. According to Roser Saurí Colomer and Patrick Hanks of Brandeis University, the Spanish surname Nieves is of Asturian-Leonese origin.

Notable people with the given name Nieves 
 Nieves Anula (born 1973), Spanish basketball player
 Nieves Confesor, Filipino politician
 Nieves Herrero (born 1957), Spanish journalist, presenter, and writer
 Nieves Hidalgo (born 1976), Spanish singer
 Nieves Mathews (1917–2003), author of Scottish and Spanish parentage
 Nieves Barragán Mohacho, Spanish chef
 Nieves Navarro (born 1938), Spanish-born Italian actress and fashion model
 Nieves Panadell (born 1956), Spanish swimmer
 Nieves Yankovic (1916–1985), Chilean actress and documentary maker
 Nieves Zuberbühler (born 1987), Argentine journalist

Notable people with the surname Nieves 
 Antonio Nieves, American professional boxer 
 Brian Nieves, American politician
 Christian Nieves, Puerto Rican cuatro player
 Christine Nieves, Puerto Rican climate activist
 Daniela Nieves Venezuelan-American actress
 José Alvarado Nieves, Mexican wrestler
 José Antonio Nieves Conde, Spanish film director and screenplay writer
 José Miguel Nieves, retired Venezuelan baseball player
 Juan Nieves, retired Puerto Rican baseball player
 Lisette Nieves, Puerto Rican-American businesswoman
 Luis López Nieves, Puerto Rican author
 Maikel Nieves, Spanish footballer for Norwegian club Råde
 María Antonieta de las Nieves, Mexican actress
 Melvin Nieves, retired Puerto Rican baseball player
 Nelson Nieves, Venezuelan fencer
 Néstor Nieves, Venezuelan long-distance runner
 Osvaldo Nieves, Puerto Rican track and field athlete
 Roberto González Nieves, Puerto Rican church leader
 Tito Nieves, Puerto Rican singer
 Wil Nieves, Puerto Rican baseball player

See also
 As Neves (Spanish Nieves), a municipality in Galicia, Spain in the province of Pontevedra
 Las Nieves, Agusan del Norte, a municipality in the Philippines
 Nieva (Spanish group), a rock/electronica band
 Nevis, a Caribbean island with the same etymology
 Blancanieves (Snow White)
Nieves v. Bartlett a US Supreme Court case

References 

Spanish-language surnames
Feminine given names